Arvedo Cecchini (2 December 1924 – 22 August 2011) was an Italian wrestler. He competed in the men's freestyle welterweight at the 1952 Summer Olympics.

References

External links
 

1924 births
2011 deaths
Italian male sport wrestlers
Olympic wrestlers of Italy
Wrestlers at the 1952 Summer Olympics
Sportspeople from Rome